Wayfinding has been used in the context of architecture to refer to the user experience of orientation and navigating within the built environment.

History
Kevin A. Lynch used the term (originally "way-finding") for his 1960 book The Image of the City, where he defined way-finding as "a consistent use and organization of definite sensory cues from the external environment."

In 1984 environmental psychologist Romedi Passini published the full-length "Wayfinding in Architecture" and expanded the concept to include the use of signage and other graphic communication, visual clues in the built environment, audible communication, tactile elements, including provisions for special-needs users.

The wayfinding concept was further expanded in a further book by renowned Canadian graphic designer Paul Arthur, and Romedi Passini, published in 1992, "Wayfinding: People, Signs and Architecture." The book serves as a veritable wayfinding bible of descriptions, illustrations, and lists, all set into a practical context of how people use both signs and other wayfinding cues to find their way in complex environments. There is an extensive bibliography, including information on exiting information and how effective it has been during emergencies such as fires in public places.

Wayfinding also refers to the set of architectural or design elements that aid orientation. Today, the term wayshowing, coined by Danish designer Per Mollerup, is used to cover the act of assisting way finding. He describes the difference between wayshowing and way finding, and codifies the nine wayfinding strategies we all use when navigating in unknown territories. However, there is some debate over the importance of using the term wayshowing, some argue that it merely adds confusion to a discipline that is already highly misunderstood.

In 2010 American Hospital Association published "Wayfinding for Health Care: Best Practices for Today's Facilities", written by Randy R. Cooper. The book takes a comprehensive view of Wayfinding specifically for those in search of medical care.

Whilst wayfinding applies to cross disciplinary practices including architecture, art and design, signage design, psychology, environmental studies, one of the most recent definitions by Paul Symonds et al. defines wayfinding as "The cognitive, social and corporeal process and experience of locating, following or discovering a route through and to a given space". Wayfinding is an embodied and sociocultural activity in addition to being a cognitive process in that wayfinding takes place almost exclusively in social environments with, around and past other people and influenced by stakeholders who manage and control the routes through which we try to find our way. The route is often one we might take for pleasure, such as to see a scenic highway, or one we take as a physical challenge such as trying to find the way through a series of caves showing our behavioural biases. Wayfinding is a complex practice that very often involves several techniques such as people-asking (asking people for directions) and crowd following and is thus a practice that combines psychological and sociocultural processes.

In addition to the built environment, the concept of wayfinding has also recently been applied to the concept of career development and an individual's attempt to create meaning within the context of career identity. This was addressed in late August, 2017 in the NPR podcast You 2.0: How Silicon Valley Can Help You Get Unstuck. The wayfinding concept is also similar to information architecture, as both use information-seeking behaviour in information environments.

Theory 
In Lynch's The Image of the City, he created a model of cities as a framework on which to build wayfinding systems. The 5 elements are what he found people use to orient themselves with a mental map. They are:

 Paths – the roads used to move around
 Edges – roads which define the boundaries and breaks in continuity
 Districts – areas which share similar characteristics
 Nodes – strong intersection points of roads like squares or junctions
 Landmarks – easily identifiable entities which are used for point-referencing, usually physical objects

Expanding on Mollerup's nine wayfinding strategies mentioned above, they are:

 Track following: to rely on directional signs on the road
 Route following: to follow the rules given, such as a pre-planned route before the journey started
 Educated seeking: to use past experiences to draw logical conclusions on where to go
 Inference: to apply norms and expectations of where things are
 Screening: to systematically search the area for a helpful clue, though there may well not be any
 Aiming: to find a perceptible target and move in that specific direction
 Map reading: to use portable or stationary maps and help the user locate themselves
 Compassing: to navigate oneself with a figurative compass, such as the location of the sun or a landmark
 Social navigation: to follow the crowd and learn from other people’s actions

Going further with the cognitive process, understanding it helps to build a better wayfinding system as designers learn how people navigate their way around and how to use those elements.

Chris Girling uses a cyclical model to explain how our decisions and actions change as we move. “Our brains are constantly sensing information, co-ordinating movement, remembering the environment and planning next steps”. The model shows how our perception can influence what information we seek out, such as some signage being too small to read or even too high up. Once we find the information we want, we make a decision which will depend on previous experiences. Finally we move, during which we look for more information to confirm that we made the right decision for our journey. The cognitive load of this will vary from person to person, as some will know the journey well while it is new to others. This understanding helps designers develop empathy for the user, as they research and test various wayfinding systems adapted to each context.

Examples

Modern wayfinding has begun to incorporate research on why people get lost, how they react to signage and how these systems can be improved.

Urban planning
An example of an urban wayfinding scheme is the Legible London Wayfinding system.

A study published in Nature showed that growing up in a grid-planned city hampers future spatial navigation skills.

In 2011, Nashville, Tennessee introduced a wayfinding sign and traffic guidance program to help tourists navigate the city center.

Indoor wayfinding

Indoor wayfinding in public buildings such as hospitals is commonly aided by kiosks, indoor maps, and building directories. Indoor wayfinding is equally important in office buildings.

Such spaces that involve areas outside the normal vocabulary of visitors show the need for a common set of language-independent symbols.

Offering indoor maps for handheld mobile devices is becoming common, as are digital information kiosk systems.

Other frequent wayfinding aids are the use of color coding and signage clustering—used to order the information into a hierarchy and prevent the issue of information overload. A number of recent airport terminals include ceiling designs and flooring patterns that encourage passengers to move along the required directional flow.

The Americans with Disabilities Act of 1990 (ADA) represented a milestone in helping to make spaces universally accessible and improving wayfinding for users.

Signage
Signage is the most visual part of wayfinding. A good wayfinding system needs well designed signage, but it also has to be well placed and to match the user’s language.

There are four types of signs most commonly used which help navigate users and give them appropriate information. They are:

 Informational: These provide useful information on the place where the users are, such as free wifi, opening hours, etc.
 Directional: As the name indicates, these direct users with arrows saying which way to go for whichever purpose. These most often at junctions when the user must make a decision about the route.
 Identification:To help users recognise where they currently are, identification signs can be placed at the entrances of buildings, parks, etc. They symbolise the arrival to a destination. 
 Regulatory: These let people know what they can and cannot do in a given area and are most frequently phrased negatively with the aim of creating a safe environment. Examples include “no smoking” or “restricted area”.

See also
 Desire path
 Environmental psychology
 Evidence-based design
 Sneckdown
 Space syntax
 Urban planning

References

Further reading
 Chris Calori (2007), Signage and Wayfinding Design: A Complete Guide to Creating Environmental Graphic Design Systems, John Wiley & Sons, 
 
 Environmental Graphics: Projects and Process from Hunt Design. 
 David Gibson (2009), The Wayfinding Handbook: Information Design for Public Places, Princeton Architectural Press,  
 Michael Bierut (2015), How to Use Graphic Design to Sell Things, Explain Things, Make Things Look Better, Make People Laugh, Make People Cry, and (Every Once in a While) Change the World, Thames & Hudson. 
 Poulin, Richard. Graphic Design + Architecture. A 20th-century History. Rockport Publishers, 2012. 
 Per Mollerop (2005), Wayshowing: A Guide to Environmental Signage Principles & Practices, Lars Muller Publications 
 Paul Arthur and Romedi Passini "Wayfinding:  People, Signs and Architecture", (originally published 1992, McGraw Hill, reissued in a limited commemorative edition in 2002 by SEGD). ,  
 Uebele, Andreas. Signage Systems and Information Graphics. Thames & Hudson, 2007 
 Menno Hubregtse (2020), Wayfinding, Consumption, and Air Terminal Design, Routledge, 

Psychogeography
Architectural theory
Environmental psychology